Staining is a village and civil parish in Lancashire, England, on the Fylde coast close to the seaside resorts of Blackpool and Lytham St Annes, and the market town of Poulton-le-Fylde. At the 2011 Census, it had a population of 2,290. Historically, the village was part of the township of Hardhorn-with-Newton. Now the hamlet of Newton is part of the civil parish of Staining; Hardhorn belongs to Poulton-le-Fylde.

History
At the Norman Conquest, Staining was part of the hundred of Amounderness, in the possession of Earl Tostig, the brother of King Harold II. Tostig died at the Battle of Stamford Bridge and his lands were subsequently taken over by the Normans. Between 1069 and 1086 William the Conqueror gave Amounderness to Anglo-Norman baron Roger the Poitevin. Staining was recorded in the Domesday Book of 1086 as Staininghe. The village was estimated in that survey to contain six carucates of land.

Governance

Historically, Staining, as part of the township of Hardhorn-with-Newton, was in the ecclesiastical parish of Poulton-le-Fylde, in the hundred of Amounderness, an ancient division of the historic county of Lancashire. Today, Staining is a civil parish, governed by a parish council.

Staining is part of the electoral ward of Staining and Weeton. The population of this ward at the 2011 census was 3,146.

Staining is represented in the House of Commons of the Parliament of the United Kingdom as part of Fylde. It elects one MP by the first past the post system of election. Since the 2010 general election, Fylde has been represented at Parliament by Conservative MP Mark Menzies. Prior to Brexit in 2020, the parish was part of the North West England constituency of the European Parliament.

Geography

Immediately south of Staining is Marton Mere, a Site of Special Scientific Interest.

Staining has a generally temperate maritime climate like much of the British Isles, with cool summers and mild winters.

Demography
At the 2011 UK Census, the civil parish of Staining had a population of 2,290, with 953 households.

Landmarks
Staining Windmill was probably built in the late 18th century. It is white, constructed of rendered brick and has a wooden cap. It has been designated a Grade II listed building by English Heritage.

St Luke's Church was built in 1865. It is an Anglican church in the Diocese of Blackburn, the archdeaconry of Lancaster and the deanery of Blackpool.

See also

Listed buildings in Staining, Lancashire
List of places in Lancashire

References
Footnotes

Bibliography

External links

Civil parishes in Lancashire
Geography of the Borough of Fylde
Villages in Lancashire